Bashar Abdullah Abdul Aziz (born 12 October 1977) is a Kuwaiti former professional footballer. He was a part of the mini revival of Kuwaiti football between 1996 and 1998. His part included winning two Gulf Cups, reaching the semi-finals of the AFC Asian Cup and coming second in the Arab Cup and Asian Olympics. He was also in the Olympic team that reached the 2000 Olympics in Sydney. He also helped his club Al-Salmiyah win the league three times and Emir Cup once.

On 26 November 2015, he announced his retirement Friendly match on January 13, 2016 between Al-Salmiya SC and Al-Hilal FC.

On 25 May 2018, he came back to play a testimonial match for Kuwait against Egypt.

Club career statistics

International career
He obtained 134 international caps with his national team, has entered the symbolic but exclusive circle of players with a century of caps. He also scored 75 international goals for Kuwait.

International goals
Scores and results list Kuwait's goal tally first.

See also
List of men's footballers with 100 or more international caps
List of men's footballers with 50 or more international goals

References

External links
 

1977 births
Living people
Kuwaiti footballers
Kuwaiti expatriate footballers
Kuwait international footballers
Olympic footballers of Kuwait
Footballers at the 2000 Summer Olympics
1996 AFC Asian Cup players
2000 AFC Asian Cup players
2004 AFC Asian Cup players
FIFA Century Club
Al Salmiya SC players
Al Hilal SFC players
Al-Rayyan SC players
Expatriate footballers in Saudi Arabia
Expatriate footballers in Qatar
Expatriate footballers in the United Arab Emirates
Kuwaiti expatriate sportspeople in Saudi Arabia
Kuwaiti expatriate sportspeople in Qatar
Kuwaiti expatriate sportspeople in the United Arab Emirates
Association football forwards
Al Ain FC players
Qatar Stars League players
UAE Pro League players
Footballers at the 2002 Asian Games
Sportspeople from Kuwait City
Asian Games competitors for Kuwait
Kuwait SC players
Kuwait Premier League players
Saudi Professional League players